Romani feminism or Gypsy feminism is the feminist trend that promotes gender equality, the fight against social inequalities and the defense of the integration of women in different movements in society, making these processes compatible with the preservation of culture and values of the Romani people.

Throughout history, the Romani ethnic group has been despised and persecuted by different societies due to their particularities. Still, it is one of the largest minorities in the world. Many groups still preserve a characteristic culture, with its own language, traditions or customs, where family and solidarity among its members is of great importance.

Romani feminism is characterized by the fight to overcome prejudices and the distinction both towards Roma society and towards women, in addition to the stigma associated with poverty.

In Spain 

The beginning of the Romani feminist movement in Spain began in 1990, when the first Romani feminist women's association in Granada appeared, the Asociación de Mujeres Gitanas ROMI. Since then, many other collectives have been created throughout the country.

One of the biggest challenges for the Roma community is to maintain the Roma tradition and identity while respecting the decision and freedom of women. This feminist trend seeks equality by claiming the right to be different.

Among the aspects most defended by this group are access to housing, education and the visibility of women. Although there are also many others, such as the normalization of sexual diversity.

See also 

 Antiziganism
 Aporophobia
 Black feminism
 Chicana feminism
 Classism
 Coloniality of gender
 Ethnocentrism
 Feminationalism
 Global feminism
 Postcolonial feminism
 Indigenous feminism
 Intersectionality
 Islamic feminism
 Postfeminism
 Purplewashing
 Transnational feminism
 Womanism

References 
 

Multicultural feminism